Han Yuzhen (1942–1979), also romanized as Han Yu-chen, was a female Chinese former international table tennis player.

Table tennis career
She won three medals at the 1961 World Table Tennis Championships;  two silver medals in the women's team and mixed doubles with Li Furong and a bronze medal in the women's doubles with Liang Lizhen.

See also
 List of table tennis players
 List of World Table Tennis Championships medalists

References

Chinese female table tennis players
1979 deaths
1942 births
Table tennis players from Harbin
World Table Tennis Championships medalists